"Lefkowitz", also written as "Levkowitz" or "Lewkowicz", is a surname of German origin, meaning "son of Levko".

Notable people with the surname Lefkowitz include:
 Bernard Lefkowitz, author and professor of journalism
 David Lefkowitz, Texas rabbi
 Jay Lefkowitz, American lawyer and Special Envoy for Human Rights in North Korea
 Louis Lefkowitz, New York politician
 Mary Lefkowitz, professor at Wellesley College in Massachusetts
 Michel Yehuda Lefkowitz, a rabbi and one of the heads of the Ponevezh yeshiva
 Nat Lefkowitz (1898–1983), American talent agency executive who served as co-chairman of the William Morris Agency
 Robert Lefkowitz, American physician and professor at Duke University
 Helen Lefkowitz Horowitz, history professor at Smith College
 Rochelle Lefkowitz, President of Pro-Media Communications
 Glyph Lefkowitz, American open-source software programmer and creator of the Twisted (software) network programming framework
 Mark Lefkowitz, entrepreneur and financial literacy teacher

Jewish surnames
German-language surnames
Polish-language surnames